St. Joseph's Convent Higher Secondary School is an all-girls high school in Nagercoil town, of Kanyakumari district in India, in the Diocese of Kottar.

History
The century-old school was started by the Congregatio Immaculati Cordis Mariae sisters of Belgium in 1910. The motto of the school is 'Rise High'. St. Joseph's primary school was started in the year 1910. It was upgraded to middle school in the year 1920. English medium school was started later and they were upgraded to high school in 1944. In 1948 it became one of the fewest schools to be upgraded to higher secondary level.

Catholic secondary schools in India
Christian schools in Tamil Nadu
Girls' schools in Tamil Nadu
Primary schools in Tamil Nadu
High schools and secondary schools in Tamil Nadu
Schools in Kanyakumari district
Education in Nagercoil
Educational institutions established in 1910
1910 establishments in India